Sangsu-dong is a legal dong, neighbourhood of the Mapo-gu district in Seoul, South Korea and was merged with Changjeon-dong into Seogang-dong in January 2007.

Transport 
The area is served by subway via Hongik University station and Sangsu station. Also, various Seoul bus lines reach the street.

See also 
Administrative divisions of South Korea

References

External links
 Mapo-gu official website in English
 Map of Mapo-gu at the Mapo-gu official website
 Map of Mapo-gu at the Mapo-gu official website
 Seogang-dong resident office website

Neighbourhoods of Mapo District